The SEAT Málaga (codenamed 023A) is a four-door saloon produced by the Spanish automaker SEAT from 1985 to 1991 and named after the city of Málaga in Andalucía in southern Spain. It can be considered a saloon variant of the SEAT Ibiza, although the underpinnings of the Málaga and the Ibiza Mark 1 were both based upon those of the SEAT Ronda. 

This was a restyled version of the SEAT Ritmo, which in its turn was the rebadged version of the Fiat Ritmo. The Málaga most closely resembled the Fiat Regata, which was Fiat’s own saloon version of the hatchback Fiat Ritmo. However, the SEAT Málaga and the Fiat Regata were developed separately as the two manufacturers had already ended their partnership by the time of the launch of their two saloon models. 

The SEAT Málaga was launched in the United Kingdom in September 1985, along with the SEAT Ibiza. It largely competed with budget offerings such as the Hyundai Pony and those from Lada, Škoda, Yugo and FSO.

Production ended in May 1991, by which time SEAT had been taken over by the Volkswagen Group. The car was replaced by the SEAT Toledo, the first Volkswagen-developed car from SEAT. The saloon based on the Ibiza, the SEAT Córdoba, was launched in end of 1993.

The Málaga sold relatively well in Spain, but was less popular in export markets despite sharing the same System Porsche Powertrain as the SEAT Ibiza. The Málaga was marketed as the SEAT Gredos in Greece after the Spanish mountain range Sierra de Gredos, because the word Málaga was considered too similar to the ubiquitous Greek swear word malakas.

Sales and production figures
The total production per year of SEAT Málaga vehicles is shown in the following table:

References

External links
 SEAT.com official corporate website

Malaga
Cars introduced in 1985
1990s cars
Front-wheel-drive vehicles
Italdesign vehicles
Cars discontinued in 1991